John Burton was Archdeacon of Cleveland from his installation on 23 July 1685 until his death on 24 November 1700.

Burton was born in Sedbergh was educated at St John's College, Cambridge. He migrated to University of Oxford in 1675. He was Vicar of Rushden and a canon of York.

References

17th-century English Anglican priests
Alumni of St John's College, Cambridge
Archdeacons of Cleveland
1700 deaths
People from Sedbergh